Dex Meets Dexter is the debut studio album by American rapper Famous Dex. It was released on April 6, 2018, by 300 Entertainment and Rich Forever Music. The album features guest appearances from Diplo, ASAP Rocky, Wiz Khalifa, and Drax Project.

The album has been supported by three singles: "Pick It Up" featuring ASAP Rocky, "Japan" and "Light" featuring Drax Project.

Singles
The album's lead single, "Pick It Up" featuring ASAP Rocky, was originally released on Famous Dex's SoundCloud account on October 18, 2017, before being released to streaming services on October 20, 2017. Its music video was released on January 17, 2018.

The album's second single, "Japan", was released to streaming services on March 16, 2018. It has peaked so far at #28 on the Billboard Hot 100, becoming Dex's highest charting single.

The album's third single, "Light" featuring Drax Project was released on March 30, 2018.

Track listing

Credits adapted from Tidal

Notes
  signifies an uncredited co-producer.
  all tracks are capitalized.

Charts

Weekly charts

Year-end charts

Certifications

References

2018 debut albums
Famous Dex albums
Albums produced by Diplo
Albums produced by FKi (production team)
Albums produced by Ronny J
Albums produced by Pi'erre Bourne